Tala is a female name that can be found in various ethnic groups. Many people share this name, but its meaning and background varies depending on the culture and language. Tala is also Samoan male name. 

Swedish, Norwegian, Danish and Icelandic – variant of old high Germanic Adalheidis. This is the oldest Scandinavian version of this name, older than 'Tale' which is more commonly used today. The early use of the name Tala in Swedish is attested by its appearance in high medieval ballads such as the 14th century ballad "Herr Holger". The Finnish version of this name is spelled Taala.
Tagalog name meaning Bright Star; also the name of the goddess of the morning star.
Tamazight name meaning Fountain
Arabic name meaning Palm heavenly  Tree.
persian  female name meaning Gold, also common in Iran.
Common Samoan name meaning to tell a tale; also the name of the national currency.
Native American name of Seneca (Iroqouis) or Lakota origin meaning "Alpha she  Wolf". 
 Also of Navajo origin meaning "Wolf Princess".
 A rarely used unisex Japanese name pronounced as "Tara", with the meaning of rely (reliable).
Notable people with the name include:
 Tala Ashe (born 1984), Iranian actress
Tala Birell (1907–1958), Romanian-American stage and film actress
Tala Gouveia, British actress
Tala Hadid, American film director and producer
Tala Madani (born 1981), American artist
Tala Marandi, Indian politician in Jharkhand
Tala Mi Daw, 14th century, first wife of King Razadarit of Hanthawaddy
Tala Mi Saw, 15th-century princess of Hanthawaddy Pegu
Tala Mi Thiri, 14th-century princess of the Martaban–Hanthawaddy Kingdom
Tala Raassi, American fashion designer
Tala Shin Saw Bok, 14th-century queen of Martaban
Tala Tudu (born 1972), Indian writer in Santali
Fictional characters:
 Lady (Fru) Tala, the evil wife of the titular character of the Swedish folk ballad "Herr Holger"
 Tala, supervillainess of the Phantom Stranger in DC Comics
 Tala, also called Wistala, the primary character in the second book in the Age of Fire series
 Tala, a protagonist-turned-antagonist in the video game Darkwatch
 Tala, in the film I Can't Think Straight
 Tala Valkov, member of the Demolition Boys (also known as the Blitzkrieg Boys) from the anime/manga series Beyblade
 Tala, a character from the Wolf Pact series by Melissa de la Cruz
 Tala, Moana's grandmother in the Disney film Moana
 Tala, pet monkey belonging to Shimmer in Shimmer and Shine on Nickelodeon
Tala, bride and sister of the female protagonist in the 2020 film Palm Springs
  Tala, in the British animated series Go Jetters
Tala, in the video game Darkwatch

See also 

 Tala (disambiguation)
 Tola (name)

References

Arabic feminine given names
North American given names
Scandinavian feminine given names
Feminine given names